Bouarfa Airport  is a public airport serving Bouarfa, a town in Oriental Region. It is located about 2 km southwest of the town. It is operated by Office National Des Aéroports.

Airlines and destinations
As of 23 Dec 2020, there are no regular commercial passenger flights

Infrastructure 
The airport has one runway marked 09/27, 3200 m long and 45 m wide with asphalt surface. There is one terminal. Ground transportation is by taxi.

References

Airports in Morocco